Milan Žurman (born 6 April 1961) is a former Slovenian football and futsal player who played as a forward. He spent majority of his football career playing for the Slovenian club Maribor, where he played between 1981–1991 and 1996–1997. He was capped 276 times and scored 82 goals for Maribor in all competitions. He was also a member of another Slovenian club, Rudar Velenje, where he spent two seasons. Outside Slovenia, he only played for the Austrian lower league clubs. Beside football, he played futsal at the professional level, starting in 1984. After retirement, he became a manager in the Austrian lower divisions.

References

External links
PrvaLiga profile 

1961 births
Living people
Yugoslav footballers
Slovenian footballers
Association football forwards
NK Maribor players
NK Rudar Velenje players
Slovenian PrvaLiga players
Slovenian expatriate footballers
Slovenian expatriate sportspeople in Austria
Expatriate footballers in Austria
Slovenian football managers